Satgachhia is a village and a gram panchayat within the jurisdiction of the Nodakhali police station in the Budge Budge II CD block in the Alipore Sadar subdivision of the South 24 Parganas district in the Indian state of West Bengal.

Geography

Demographics
According to the 2011 Census of India, Satgachhia had a total population of 2,129.

Transport
A short stretch of local roads link Satgachhia to the Budge Budge Trunk Road.

Budge Budge railway station is located nearby.

Healthcare
Lakshmibala Dutta Rural Hospital, with 30 beds, at Bakrahat, is the major government medical facility in the Budge Budge II CD block.

References

Villages in South 24 Parganas district